Anbyŏn is a kun, or county, in Kangwŏn province, North Korea.  Originally included in South Hamgyŏng province, it was transferred to Kangwŏn province in a September 1946 reshuffling of local government.

Physical features
The southwest portion of the county is bounded by the Masingryŏng (마식령산맥) and Taebaek mountains, which meet at the pass of Ch'ugaryŏng (추가령).  The highest point is Paegamsan.

Anbyŏn's major streams include the Namdaech'ŏn and the Hakch'ŏn.  The Anbyŏn Plain is situated along the Namdaech'ŏn's course. The temperature is warmer in the north than in the south.

Administrative divisions
Anbyŏn county is divided into 1 ŭp (town), 2 rodongjagu (workers' districts) and 28 ri (villages):

Economy
Agriculture
In the Anbyŏn Plain, rice-farming is the predominant industry. Orcharding also plays an important role.

Manufacturing
Tile manufacturing also takes place.

Mining
There are local deposits of gold, silver, copper and zinc, but they are not widely exploited.

Electricity generation
In 2000, construction of the Anbyŏn Youth Power Station, a hydroelectric facility, was completed. The workers were honored with a personal communique from Kim Jong-il.

Film-making
Anbyŏn is the setting for many North Korean films. Thus it has been dubbed the Hollywood of North Korea.

Chemicals
A chemical weapons storage facility is believed to be located in the county's Chiha-ri precinct. The facility is said to include numerous tunnels dug deep into the mountains, and may also host some biological weapons.

Transport
The Kangwŏn and Kŭmgangsan Ch'ŏngnyŏn lines of the Korean State Railway pass through the county, which is also served by road.

Wildlife
Anbyŏn contains a 1000 ha site, Anbyŏn Field, that has been identified as an Important Bird Area by BirdLife International because it is a wintering ground for red-crowned cranes.

See also
Geography of North Korea
Administrative divisions of North Korea

References

External links

Counties of Kangwon Province (North Korea)